El Ombú is a Mennonite agricultural settlement in Río Negro Department, Uruguay. It is located 284 km NW of Montevideo and 29 km SE of Young, near the Route 3.

Established in 1950 by Vistula delta Mennonites who came from West Prussia, Danzig and Poland, it was the first Mennonite settlement on Uruguayan territory. It takes its name from the most popular native tree in Uruguay, ombú (Phytolacca dioica).

Previously the area had a German school, Deutsche Schule El-Ombu.

See also
Gartental
Mennonites in Uruguay

References

External links
  
 

1950 establishments in Uruguay
Mennonitism in Uruguay
Polish diaspora in South America
Populated places in the Río Negro Department
Religion in Río Negro Department
Vistula delta Mennonites